Simon W. Gerson (January 23, 1909 – December 26, 2004) was a top leader of the Communist Party USA.  In particular, he was considered its leading expert on campaigns and election.  He was perhaps most famous for being the party's appointee to fill the New York City Council vacancy left by the death of Peter Cacchione, but with the council refusing to seat him.  He was also an editor for The Daily Worker.

Life

Simon W. Gerson was born on January 23, 1909, in New York City. Both of his parents were both members of the Socialist Party of America, but his mother later became a member of the Communist Party USA and supported William Z. Foster's presidential campaigns while his father supported Norman Thomas' campaigns. He joined the Young Communist League USA while attending the City College of New York and was expelled from the college in 1928 for leading antimilitarism activities. Gerson worked as a city hall reporter and executive editor for the Daily Worker and also worked for its successor the Daily World.

In 1938, he was selected to serve as executive assistant to Stanley M. Isaacs, the borough president of Manhattan, making him the first communist to hold any appointed office in New York City. He served in the Pacific theater during World War II. Peter Cacchione, a Communist member of the New York City Council, died in 1947, and Gerson was nominated by the Communists to replace him, but the council refused to fill the vacancy. He ran for a seat on the city council in the 1948 election with the nominations of the Communist and American Labor parties. He received 118,000 votes on the Communist ballot line and 132,000 votes on the American Labor ballot line, but lost the election. He later served as Gus Hall's campaign manager during the 1980 presidential election.

Si Gerson was married to Sophie Melvin, a union organiser involved in the Loray Mill Strike.

Gerson's papers were donated to the Tamiment Library after his death.

Works
 Pete: The Story of Peter V. Cacchione, New York's First Communist Councilman (International Publishers, 1976)
 Do We Have Free Elections (International Publishers)
 After Fifty Years: Revisiting the U.S.S.R. (International Publishers, 1978)

References

External links
 People's Weekly World Biography
 Guide to the Simon W. Gerson papers at the Tamiment Library
 Obituary by Shaun Richman

1909 births
2004 deaths
American male journalists
20th-century American journalists
American communists